1963–64 Albanian Cup was the 14th season of Albania's annual cup competition. It began in August 1963 with the First Round and ended in May 1964 with the Final match. 17 Nëntori were the defending champions, having won their second Albanian Cup last season, but failed to defend the title. The cup was won by Partizani.

The rounds were played in a one-legged format similar to those of European competitions. If the number of goals was equal, the match was decided by extra time and a penalty shoot-out, if necessary.

First round
The games were played on August, 1963*

 Results unknown

Second round 
In this round entered the 16 winners from the previous round. The games were played in January 1964.

|}

Quarter-finals
In this round entered the 8 winners from the previous round.

|}

Semi-finals 
In this round entered the four winners from the previous round.

|}

Final

References 

 Calcio Mondiale Web

External links 

Albanian Cup seasons
Cup
Albania